Pill Football Club is an association football club based in the Pillgwenlly area of the city of Newport, South Wales. The team currently play in the Gwent County League Premier Division, which is at the fourth tier of the Welsh football league system.

History
The club was formed in May 2018 by the merger of former Welsh Football League club, Newport YMCA who were then playing in the Gwent County League Division One and Pill AFC who were in Division Two.

The club finished fifth and seventh in their first two seasons as a new club.

For the 2022–23 season the club reverted to 'Pill AFC' as the club's name.

References

External links
 

Football clubs in Wales
Gwent County League clubs
Football clubs in Newport, Wales
Association football clubs established in 2018
2018 establishments in Wales